Jagdish Piyush (6 August 1950 – 5 February 2021) was an Indian Hindi writer, a leader of the Indian National Congress and Educationist from Amethi, Uttar Pradesh, India. He was also the media representative of former prime minister Shri Rajiv Gandhi and in 1984, he also gave the slogan of Amethi Ka Danka, Bitiya Priyanka. 

He died on 5 February 2021 in Sanjay Gandhi Hospital in Munshiganj Amethi.

Early life 
He was born on 6 August 1950 in a simple farmer family of Kasara village of Sangrampur block of Amethi district, lived in the Gauriganj city for the last several decades. He did a great work in the literary world, especially in the field of Awadhi literary creation and was also the editor of Amethi Samachar.

Literary works
Piyush had contributed in Awadhi literature.

 Kisse Awadh Ke
 Avadhi Sahitya Sarvekshan Aur Samiksha
 LOK SAHITYA KE PITAMAH PANDIT RAM NARESH TRIPATHI
 Adhunik Sahitya Khand 
 Rajiv Gandhi Ke Sapno Ka Bharat
 Sonia Gandhi Rajneeti Ki Pawitra Ganga
 Gandhi : Gandhi : Gandhi - Balidan Ki Asmapt Gatha

References

1950 births
2021 deaths
People from Amethi
Indian_National_Congress_politicians_from_Uttar_Pradesh